Tekfen Holding A.S. (Tekfen Group) is a Turkey-based holding company involved in engineering and construction, textile, food processing and other industrial sectors.

History

With foundations laid in 1956 by three civil engineers – Feyyaz Berker, Nihat Gökyiğit, and Necati Akçağlılar – Tekfen Holding today conducts its operations through thirty-eight companies and thirteen subsidiaries, each of which is a leading name in its respective business line, and that are active in five  main areas: Engineering and Contracting, Chemical Industry, Agricultural Production, Services, Investment. Tekfen Holding is the umbrella company for all of the firms and subsidiaries in the Tekfen Group. Its shares are traded on the Borsa İstanbul and are quoted in that exchange’s BIST 30 Index. The Tekfen Group’s founding partners have served as the originators, benefactors and directors of many environmental, educational, and social NGOs. Those roles kept people, social welfare, and environmental wellbeing at the focal point of the Tekfen Group’s business culture and charitable activities since the very outset.

See also

Turkish construction and contracting industry
List of companies of Turkey
SOCAR Tower

References

External links
 
Tekfen Official Website 

Conglomerate companies of Turkey
Electric power companies of Turkey
Companies listed on the Istanbul Stock Exchange
Construction and civil engineering companies of Turkey
Companies based in Istanbul
Conglomerate companies established in 1956
Turkish companies established in 1956
Construction and civil engineering companies established in 1956